Young and Beautiful is a 1934 American romantic comedy film directed by Joseph Santley and starring William Haines and Judith Allen. The screenplay concerns a press agent who goes to great lengths to make his actress girlfriend a star, only to risk losing her in the process.

Plot
In Hollywood, press agent Robert Preston gets into trouble with his boss, Herman Cline, head of Superba Pictures, for neglecting his duties in order to publicize the 13 WAMPUS Baby Stars, June Dale in particular, at a banquet in their honor. However, he sweet talks Mrs. Cline and keeps his job. June shows up and faints, shaken by a failed abduction attempt. It turns out to be a publicity stunt concocted by Preston for his fiancée.

Cast
William Haines as Robert Preston
Judith Allen as June Dale
Joseph Cawthorn as Herman Cline
John Miljan as Gordon Douglas
Ted Fio Rito as himself
Al Shaw as Piano Mover (as Shaw and Lee)
Sam Lee as Piano Mover (as Shaw and Lee)
 James Bush as Dick
Vince Barnett as Sammy (as Vincent Barnett)
Warren Hymer as The Champion
Franklin Pangborn as Radio announcer
James P. Burtis as Farrell
Syd Saylor as Hansen
Greta Meyer as Mrs. Cline
Fred Kelsey as Hennessy
Andre Beranger as Henry Briand
Ray Mayer as Songwriter
The Wampus Baby Stars:
Judith Arlen
Betty Bryson
Jean Carmen
Dorothy Drake
Jean Gale
Hazel Hayes
Ann Hovey
Neoma Judge
Lucille Lund
Lu Anne Meredith
Katherine Williams

External links

1934 films
1934 romantic comedy films
American black-and-white films
American romantic comedy films
Films about actors
Films about Hollywood, Los Angeles
Films directed by Joseph Santley
Mascot Pictures films
Films produced by Nat Levine
Publicity stunts in fiction
1930s American films